Lent (album) is the first album by Dallas Crane, released in 1998. The album has become very rare.

Track listing
 Nylon Don't Breath
 A Romantic Comedy
 Suppose I'm a Catholic
 Jonco
 Mr. Meddle
 Days of the Wild
 T.V.
 Trenchcoat De Ville
 Cyclone
 January

Dallas Crane albums